Label is a small Oceanic language spoken on New Ireland in Papua New Guinea.

References

Languages of New Ireland Province
St George linkage